This is a list of heads of state and heads of government who have visited Sri Lanka from its Independence from British.

List

References 

Foreign relations of Sri Lanka
Sri Lanka politics-related lists
Diplomatic visits by destination